Queen of the Night may refer to:

Botany
 Queen of the night, Night-blooming cereus, several genera and species of cactus, especially:
 Epiphyllum oxypetalum
 Selenicereus grandiflorus
 Queen of the night, Cestrum nocturnum, a woody evergreen commonly known as night-blooming cestrum
Reina de la noche ("queen of the night" in Spanish), Brugmansia, also called angel's trumpet

Archaeology
 Queen of the Night Relief, formerly known as the Burney Relief, a Mesopotamian terracotta plaque in the British Museum, who adopted the new name in 2003

Film, television, and theater
 The Queen of the Night, a 1994 Mexican film
 La Femme d'une nuit, a 1931 French film
 Queen of the Night (1931 German-language film) (Königin einer Nacht), a 1931 German film
 Queen of the Night (1931 Italian-language film) (La donna di una notte), a 1931 Italian film
 Queen of the Night (1951 film), a West German musical film
 Queen of the Night (2001 film) (Kraljica noći), a Croatian film
 Queen of the Night (2013 film), a South Korean film
 Queen of the Night (2014 film), Canadian film released as The Captive
 Queen of the Night, a 2013 immersive theater production at Sony Hall

Literature
 Queen of the Night, a novel by Alexander Chee

Music
 "Queen of the Night aria" ("")
 Queen of the Night (Maggie Bell album)
 Queen of the Night (Loleatta Holloway album), 1978
 "Queen of the Night" (song), a 1993 single by Whitney Houston
 "Queen of the Night", a song by Angra from their EP Freedom Call
 "Queen of the Night", a song by Lovex from their 2011 album Watch Out!